The 2016 BYU Cougars women's soccer team represented BYU during the 2016 NCAA Division I women's soccer season. The Cougars were coached for a 22nd consecutive season by Jennifer Rockwood, who was co-coach in 1995 and became the solo head coach in 1996. Before 1995 BYU women's soccer competed as a club team and not as a member of the NCAA. The Cougars entered the 2016 season having won four consecutive West Coast Conference championships and having made the NCAA Tournament each of the last four seasons and in 17 of the 21 seasons that Rockwood has been the head coach. The Cougars came off of a season were they advanced to the second round of the College Cup before being defeated by Stanford to finish the season 16–3–2. The Cougars split the WCC regular season title with Pepperdine and advanced to the third round of the NCAA College Cup before falling to South Carolina 1–0.

Media

Television & Internet Streaming
Every BYU women's soccer game was shown live on BYUtv, TheW.tv, had a road television broadcast, or had a road internet stream. Information on these television broadcasts can be found under each individual match.

Nu Skin Cougar IMG Sports Network

For a third consecutive season the Cougar IMG Sports Network will air BYU Cougars women's soccer games. Greg Wrubell will provide play-by-play for most games with Robbie Bullough being the back-up play-by-play broadcaster. Former men's assistant coach Hugh Van Wagenen (typically home games) and Colette Smith (typically road games) will once again act as analysts. ESPN 960 and BYU Radio will act as the flagship stations for women's soccer.

Schedule

 *- Denotes WCC game
x- Denotes Cougar IMG Sports Network/ESPN 960 broadcast
y- Television Broadcast
z- Internet Stream

x-Exhibition: Blue/White Game
Two 35 minutes halves were played.
Broadcasters: Greg Wrubell & Hugh Van Wagenen (ESPN 960)

x-Exhibition: Alumni Game
Two 40 minutes halves were played.
Broadcasters: Greg Wrubell, Cody John Walker (1st Half), & Jaleah Tuttle (2nd Half) (ESPN 960)

x-Exhibition: UCLA
Series History: BYU leads series 2–1–1
Broadcasters: Greg Wrubell & Colette Smith (ESPN 960/BYU Radio)

xy-Washington State
Series History: BYU leads series 3–2–2
Broadcasters: Troy Clardy & Kyndra de St. Aubin (P12)Greg Wrubell & Colette Smith (ESPN 960/BYU Radio)

xy-Nebraska
Series History: Nebraska leads series 3–2–0
Broadcasters: Spencer Linton, Natalyn Lewis, & Lauren Francom (BYUtv)Greg Wrubell & Hugh Van Wagenen (ESPN 960/BYU Radio)

xz-Penn State
Series History: BYU leads series 1–0–0
Broadcasters: No commentary (GoPSUnow)Greg Wrubell & Colette Smith (ESPN 960/BYU Radio)

xy-Tennessee
Series History: BYU leads series 2–1–0
Broadcasters: Spencer Linton, Natalyn Lewis, & Lauren Francom (BYUtv) Greg Wrubell & Hugh Van Wagenen (ESPN 960/BYU Radio)

xy-Utah
Series History: BYU leads series 20–7–1
Broadcasters: Ann Schatz & Kyndra de St. Aubin (P12)Greg Wrubell & Hugh Van Wagenen (ESPN 960/BYU Radio)

xy-SMU
Series History: BYU leads series 3–0–0
Broadcasters: Spencer Linton, Natalyn Lewis, & Lauren Francom (BYUtv) Greg Wrubell & Hugh Van Wagenen (ESPN 960/BYU Radio)

xz-Ohio State
Series History: First Meeting
Broadcasters: Kevin Neibecker & Nathan Rubinstein (BTN+)Greg Wrubell & Colette Smith (ESPN 960/BYU Radio)

xz-Utah State
Series History: BYU leads series 12–0–0
Broadcasters: Chuck Longoria (MW Network)Robbie Bullough & Hugh Van Wagenen (ESPN 960/BYU Radio)

xz-Denver
Series History: BYU leads series 2–1–0
Broadcasters: Mitchell Marshall (TheW.tv)Greg Wrubell & Hugh Van Wagenen (ESPN 960/BYU Radio)

xy-Long Beach State
Series History: BYU leads series 6–2–0
Broadcasters: Spencer Linton, Natalyn Lewis, & Lauren Francom (BYUtv)Robbie Bullough & Hugh Van Wagenen (ESPN 960/BYU Radio)

xy-Santa Clara*
Series History: Santa Clara leads series 6–1–3
Broadcasters: Jarom Jordan, Natalyn Lewis, & Lauren Francom (BYUtv)Greg Wrubell & Hugh Van Wagenen (ESPN 960/BYU Radio)

xy-San Francisco*
Series History: BYU leads series 5–1–0
Broadcasters: Spencer Linton, Natalyn Lewis, & Lauren Francom (BYUtv)Greg Wrubell & Hugh Van Wagenen (ESPN 960/BYU Radio)

xy-Loyola Marymount*
Series History: BYU leads series 6–1–0
Broadcasters: Trey Bender & Cat Whitehill (ESPNU)Greg Wrubell & Colette Smith (ESPN 960/BYU Radio)

xz-Pepperdine*
Series History: BYU leads series 4–3–0
Broadcasters: Jen Karson (TheW.tv)Robbie Bullough & Colette Smith (ESPN 960)

xy-Portland*
Series History: BYU leads series 6–4–0Broadcasters:  Spencer Linton, Natalyn Lewis, & Lauren Francom (BYUtv)Greg Wrubell & Hugh Van Wagenen (ESPN 960/BYU Radio)

xz-San Diego*
Series History: BYU leads series 6–2–0
Broadcasters: Jack Cronin (TheW.tv)Greg Wrubell & Colette Smith (ESPN 960/BYU Radio)

xz-Saint Mary's*
Series History: BYU leads series 5–0–1
Broadcasters: Corey Crone & Anne Whipple (TheW.tv)Greg Wrubell & Colette Smith (ESPN 960/BYU Radio)

xz-Pacific*
Series History: BYU leads series 6–1–0
Broadcasters: Paul Muyskens (YouTube)Robbie Bullough & Colette Smith (ESPN 960/BYU Radio)

xz-Gonzaga*
Series History: BYU leads series 8–0–0
Broadcasters:  Robbie Bullough & Hugh Van Wagenen (TheW.tv/ESPN 960/BYU Radio)

xy-UNLV
Series History: BYU leads series 15–1–2Broadcasters:  Spencer Linton, Natalyn Lewis, & Lauren Francom (BYUtv)Greg Wrubell & Hugh Van Wagenen (ESPN 960/BYU Radio)

yz-Oklahoma
Series History: Series tied 1–1–0Broadcasters:  No commentary (ESPN3)Greg Wrubell & Colette Smith (ESPN 960/BYU Radio)

yz-South Carolina
Series History: First MeetingBroadcasters:  Brad Muller & Nancy Goffi (SEC+)Robbie Bullough & Colette Smith (ESPN 960/BYU Radio)

Roster

Rankings

References

2016 in sports in Utah
2016 West Coast Conference women's soccer season
BYU
2016 team